Yuxarı Ləgər (also, Yukhary Leger) is a village and municipality in the Qusar Rayon of Azerbaijan.  It has a population of 533.

Notable natives 

 Mirza Valiyev — Hero of the Soviet Union.

References 

Populated places in Qusar District